Carrio is a civil parish in Laviana, Asturias, Spain.

Carrio, Carrío and Carrió may also refer to:

People
 Adrian Carrio (born 1989), American race car driver
 Adrián Carrio (born 1986), Spanish jazz pianist 
 Elisa Carrió (born 1956), Argentine politician
 Orlando Carrió (1955–2002), Argentine actor
 Pedro Carrío (born 1970), Cuban swimmer

Places
 Carrió (Carreño), a civil parish in Asturias, Spain